John of Austria (24 February 1547 – 1 October 1578) was the natural son born to Holy Roman Emperor Charles V late in life when he was a widower. Charles V met his son only once, recognizing him in a secret codicil to his will. John became a military leader in the service of his half-brother, King Philip II of Spain, Charles V's legitimate heir, and is best known for his role as the admiral of the Holy Alliance fleet at the Battle of Lepanto.

Life

Early years

Born in the Free imperial city of Regensburg, Upper Palatinate, John of Austria was the product of a brief liaison between Charles V, Holy Roman Emperor (a widower since 1539) and Barbara Blomberg, a burgher's daughter and singer.

In the summer of 1554, the boy was taken to the castle of Luis de Quijada in Villagarcía de Campos, Valladolid. Magdalena de Ulloa, the wife of Luis de Quijada, took charge of his education, assisted by the Latin teacher Guillén Prieto, the chaplain García de Morales and the squire Juan Galarza. 

Charles V wrote a codicil, dated 6 June 1554, in which he recognized: "For since I was in Germany, after being widowed, I had a natural child of one unmarried woman, named Geronimo". In the summer of 1558, Charles V had ordered Luis de Quijada, his wife Magdalena de Ulloa, and Jeromín to relocate to the village of Cuacos de Yuste. The Emperor was already residing nearby at the Monastery of Yuste. From that time forward, and until his own death in September of that year, Charles V saw his son (now an 11-year-old boy) several times. In his last will of 1558, the Emperor officially recognized Jeromín as his son, and had requested that the child would be renamed John. Charles also made the provision that John should enter the clergy and pursue an ecclesiastical career.

Charles V's only surviving legitimate son and heir, now King Philip II after his father's abdication, was then outside of Spain. Rumors had spread about the paternity of the child, which de Quijada had denied, and he wrote to the Emperor asking for instructions. Charles V replied with a note written by his personal secretary Eraso, in whose erasures and amendments were expressed the Emperor's thoughts about how best to deal with such a delicate matter. It was recommended to wait for Philip II's return to Spain. Joanna, Dowager Princess of Portugal and Regent of the Kingdom during the absence of her brother Philip II, asked to see the child, which she did in Valladolid in May 1559, coinciding with an Auto-da-fé then taking place.

Philip II returned from Brussels in 1559, aware of his father's will. Once he had settled in Valladolid, he had summoned de Quijada to bring along Jeromín to a hunt. The first meeting between the two of them took place on 28 September in the Monastery of Santa María de La Santa Espina. When the King appeared, Luis de Quijada told Jeromín to dismount and make proper obeisance to his master. When Jeromín did so, Philip II asked him if he knew the identity of his father. When the boy did not know, the King embraced him and explained that they had the same father and thus were brothers. Philip II, however, was strict regarding protocol: although Jeromín was a member of the House of Habsburg, he was not to be addressed as "Your Highness", the form reserved for royals and sovereign princes. In formal style he was "Your Excellency", the address used for a Spanish grandee, and known as Don Juan de Austria. John did not live in a royal palace, but rather maintained a separate household with Luis de Quijada as the head. King Philip II had allowed John the incomes allocated to him by Charles V, so that he might maintain the status proper to a son of an emperor and brother to the king. In public ceremonies, John stood, walked or rode behind the royal family, but ahead of the grandees.

Formative years
John de Austria completed his education at the university of Alcalá de Henares (now the Complutense University), where he attended with his two young nephews, who were about his same age: Prince Carlos (son and heir of Philip II) and Alessandro Farnese, Prince of Parma (son of Charles V's other acknowledged illegitimate child, Margaret of Austria, Duchess of Parma). They all had Honorato Hugo (disciple of Juan Luis Vives) as a teacher. In 1562, the "House of Don John of Austria" appears in the budget of the Royal House, assigning to him 15,000 ducats, the same amount allocated to his half-sister Joanna, Dowager Princess of Portugal, with whom John had a close relationship.

At the University of Alcalá de Henares, John began his preparation for his future ecclesiastical career. It was there in 1562, that Prince Carlos had suffered a fractured skull which had a deleterious effect on his personality.

In 1565, Alessandro Farnese left Alcalá de Henares to reside in Brussels, where his mother Margaret of Parma was Governor of the Spanish Netherlands. Alessandro had married Maria of Portugal while in Brussels. It was said that John had learned from Alessandro how to be a philanderer. In time, John would acknowledge two illegitimate daughters, one in Spain, the other in Naples.

In addition, John of Austria actively participated in court ceremonies: at the baptisms of his nieces, Philip II's daughters, Isabella Clara Eugenia and Catherine Michaela. John would be the one assigned to carry the infantas to the baptismal font.

In 1565, the Ottoman Empire had attacked the island of Malta. To defend itself, a fleet was gathered at the port of Barcelona. John had asked Philip II for permission to join the navy, but he was denied. In spite of this, John had left the court and travelled to Barcelona, but was not able to reach the fleet in time. Only a letter from his brother King Philip II made John give up his efforts to continue to rendezvous with the fleet of García Álvarez de Toledo y Osorio, 4th Marquis of Villafranca del Bierzo, then located in Italy.

Prince Carlos, probably because of his uncle's position, and also due to the friendship they had for years, confided to John of Austria his plans to flee Spain and to travel towards the Spanish Netherlands from Italy. Prince Carlos needed John's help to acquire a galley that would ferry him to Italy. In exchange for his assistance, the Prince had promised John the Kingdom of Naples. John told the Prince that he would give him an answer, and went immediately afterwards to the El Escorial to report it to the King.

John returned to the Mediterranean to take charge of the fleet. After meeting with his advisers in Cartagena on 2 June 1568, he went out to sea to fight the corsairs. This he did for a period of three months as he sailed across to North Africa, along the coast, and landed at Oran, and Melilla.

Rebellion of the Alpujarras

A decree dated 1 January 1567 forced the moriscos who lived in the Kingdom of Granada, particularly in the Alpujarras area, to abandon their customs, language, dresses, and religious practices altogether. The application of the rule caused, as early as April 1568, an open revolt being planned. At the end of that year, almost two hundred towns began the revolt.

The king deposed Iñigo López de Mendoza, 3rd Marquis of Mondejar and appointed John of Austria Captain General, that is, supreme commander of the royal forces. Philip II placed John in the care of trustworthy advisors, including Luis de Requesens. On 13 April 1569 John arrived in Granada, where he built his forces with care, learning about logistics and drill. Luis de Requesens and Álvaro de Bazán patrolled the coast with their galleys, limiting aid and reinforcements from Barbary.

The deportation policy aggravated the situation. To achieve greater effectiveness, John asked his half-brother for permission to go on the offensive. The King granted his request and John left Granada at the head of a large and well-supplied army. After clearing rebels from nearby Granada, he then marched east through Guadix, where veteran troops from Italy joined him, bringing his total troop strength to 12,000. At the end of the year 1569 he had managed to pacify Güéjar, and in late January 1570 put under siege the stronghold of Galera. The siege at Galera had stalled, as it was a difficult fortress to take. John ordered a general assault, making use of artillery and strategically set mines. On 10 February 1570, he entered the village, and had it levelled to the ground with salt ploughed into its soil. Between 400 and 4500 inhabitants were killed, and 2000 to 4500 survivors were sold into slavery.
He then marched on the fortress of Serón, where he was shot in the head, and his foster father Luis de Quijada was wounded, dying a week later, on 25 February, in Caniles. Soon after John took the town of Terque, which dominated the entire middle valley of the Almería river.

In May 1570, John had negotiated a peace with El Habaquí. In the summer and fall of 1570 the last campaigns were carried out to subdue the rebels. In February 1571, Philip II signed the decree of expulsion of all the moriscos from the Kingdom of Granada. John's letters described the forced exile of entire families, women and children, as the greatest "human misery" that can be portrayed.

The War of Cyprus and Battle of Lepanto

The War of Cyprus became the focus of Spain's attention after Pope Pius V sent an envoy to urge Philip to join with him and Venice in a Holy League against the Turks. Philip II agreed and negotiations opened in Rome. Among Philip's terms was the appointment of John as commander-in-chief of the Holy League armada. While he agreed that Cyprus should be relieved, he was also concerned to recover control of Tunis, where Turks had overthrown the regime of Philip's client Muslim ruler. Tunis posed an immediate threat to Sicily, one of Philip II's kingdoms. Philip II also had in mind the eventual conquest of Algiers, whose corsairs posed a constant nuisance to Spain. Charles V had tried and failed to take it in 1541.

While John finished the pacification of Granada, negotiations dragged on in Rome. In the summer of 1570 Philip sailed for Cyprus under the pope's admiral Marcantonio Colonna. In charge of Philip's contingent was the Genoese Gian Andrea Doria, a great-nephew of the renowned Andrea Doria. On reaching the Turkish coast in September, Colonna and the Venetians wished to press on to Cyprus while Doria argued that the season had grown too late. Then news arrived that Nicosia, the capital of Cyprus, had fallen, and only the port of Famagusta held out. Sickness hit the Venetian fleet and a consensus grew that it was best to return to port. The weather turned ugly and while Doria reached port in good order, the Venetians were storm-battered. Among the Christian allies, animosities became open while the Turks tightened their siege of Famagusta.

The Venetians repaired their galley fleet and readied six heavily armed galleasses. The Pope hired twelve galleys from the Grand Duke of Tuscany. The dukes of Savoy and Parma also provided galleys, and Alexander Farnese sailed in one. When the League was formally signed in May, John was designated commander-in-chief and given his many instructions by Philip. With the instructions came a warning not to involve himself with women, which, among other instructions, was ignored by John. It was late July before he sailed with the Spanish squadron from Barcelona, and mid-September before the entire Holy League armada got underway from Messina. Don John was determined to fight, rallying allies and quelling their mutual suspicions.

John found the Turkish fleet at Lepanto in the Gulf of Corinth. After some debate, the Turks chose to fight, even though they had been at sea all summer and disbanded some of their people. They had the larger fleet, nearly 300 vessels to John's 207 galleys and six galleasses. On 7 October 1571, the Turkish fleet emerged into the Gulf of Patras and took battle formation. Bringing his fleet through islets known as the Curzolaris (now mostly lost to the silting of the shoreline), John deployed his armada into a left wing under Venetian command, a right wing under Doria, a powerful center or main battle under himself, and a strong rear guard under the Marquis of Santa Cruz. In all four formations were galleys from each of the participating states. Two galleasses each were assigned to the wings and center. Around noon the battle commenced. The cannonade of the galleasses disrupted the Turkish formations as they pressed to the attack, and the bigger and more numerous guns of the Christian allies did devastating damage as the Turkish right and center closed to board. In the seesaw fighting on decks, the allies prevailed. Among their wounded was the 24-year-old Miguel de Cervantes, future writer of Don Quixote. Cervantes later wrote a description of the courage of the Christian combatants.

The Turkish left wing under Uluj Ali, the governor general of Algiers and their best admiral, tried to outmaneuver Doria's wing, drawing it away from the League center. When a gap appeared between Doria and the center, Uluj Ali made a quick turn about and aimed at the gap, smashing three galleys of the Knights of Malta on John's right flank. John came around smartly while the Marquis of Santa Cruz hit Uluj Ali hard with his rear guard. Uluj Ali himself and maybe half his wing escaped. The victory was near total, with the Turkish fleet destroyed and thousands of veterans lost. The League's losses were hardly negligible, with over 13,000 dead. However, the League liberated over ten thousand Christian slaves, a compensation for their losses. In the evening a storm broke and the victors had to head for port, while sporadic Greek uprisings were ruthlessly suppressed by the Turks. During and after the battle of Lepanto, John was addressed in letters and in person with "Highness" and "Prince". This was in contradiction to the initial protocol and address by Philip. There are no records to indicate if Philip gave Don John these honours.

The Low Countries

	 
When Luis de Requesens died on 5 March 1576, the Council of State urged the king to appoint a new governor immediately, recommending that it be a member of the royal family. Philip II appointed John of Austria as governor-general. He made his entry into Brussels on 1 May 1577.

Don Juan captured the city of Namur on 24 July 1577. In January 1578 he crushingly defeated the Protestants in the Battle of Gembloux. The defeat at Gembloux forced Prince William of Orange, the leader of the revolt, to leave Brussels. The victory of John also meant the end of the Union of Brussels, and hastened the disintegration of the unity of the rebel provinces. Six months later John in turn was defeated at Rijmenam.

Death

His health began to deteriorate, and he was attacked by a fever. John of Austria died two months after Rijmenam on Sunday, 1 October 1578, at the age of 31. To avoid his body being captured at sea by Spain's enemies, it was returned to Madrid overland in four saddle bags and reassembled once there. John was buried in the Escorial, the only illegitimate Habsburg to be so honored.

Relationships and descendants

The following women are confirmed to have had a relationship with John of Austria:
 Maria of Mendoza (1545 – 22 April 1570), lady-in-waiting of Joanna of Austria, Princess of Portugal and daughter of Diego Hurtado of Mendoza, Prince of Melito and 1st Duke of Francavilla. They had one daughter:
 Maria Ana of Austria (November 1569, Villagarcía de Campos, Madrid – 27 November 1629, Las Huelgas, Burgos), who later became Abbess of Santa María la Real de Las Huelgas since 1611.
 Diana Falangola (born 1556), daughter of Scipione Falangola, Lord of Fagnano. They had a daughter: 
 Juana of Austria (11 September 1573, Naples – 7 February 1630, Militello), who married at Palermo on 20 April 1603 Francesco Branciforte, 2nd Prince of Pietrapersia. They had five daughters: 
 Margherita Branciforte d'Austria (11 January 1605, Naples – 24 January 1659, Rome), Princess of Butera; married Federico Colonna, 5th Duke of Tagliacozzo, with whom she had one son: 
Antonio Colonna, Prince of Pietrapersia (1619–1623).
 Flavia Branciforte d'Austria (3 June 1606, Naples – 24 May 1608, Naples).
 Caterina Branciforte d'Austria (4 May 1609, Naples – 6 June 1613, Naples). 
 Elisabetta Branciforte d'Austria (9 December 1611, Naples – 7 August 1615, Naples). 
 Anna Branciforte d'Austria (6 July 1615, Naples – 1 September 1615, Naples).
 Zenobia Saratosia (born ca. 1540), daughter of Vincenzo Saratosia and Violante Garofano. They had one son:
Unnamed (born and died in 1574); reportedly died at childbirth, although it was rumoured that Philip II had a hand in his death.
 Anne of Toledo, with whom he had no known children.

Legacy

A monument to John of Austria was erected in Messina at the initiative of the local Senate in 1572, to honour the victor of Lepanto. The statue survived the devastating 1908 earthquake however it was moved to another location in the city.

A statue of John, copy of the one in Messina, was erected in his birthplace Regensburg in 1978 on the fourth centenary of his death.

In literature
A "Don John" is a villain in William Shakespeare's 1599 play Much Ado About Nothing. He is listed in the dramatis personae as "illegitimate brother to Don Pedro", Prince of Aragon. 
Don John of Austria's life inspired the 1835 play Don Juan d'Autriche by Casimir Delavigne, which served in turn as a source for two operas, Don John of Austria by Isaac Nathan in 1847 and Don Giovanni d'Austria by Filippo Marchetti in 1879. Lepanto remains his great triumph.
G. K. Chesterton in 1911 published a poem, Lepanto, in which he dubbed Don John "the last knight of Europe".
The historical novel A Knight of Spain (1913) by Marjorie Bowen depicts the relationship between Don John of Austria and his half-brother, Philip.
The historical romance, Spanish Lover, by Frank H. Spearman (Charles Scribner's Sons, 1930), has Don John as its central character.
In 1956, Louis de Wohl published The Last Crusader: A Novel about Don Juan of Austria, presenting Don John of Austria as one of history's most triumphant and inspiring heroes.
The 1990 historical novel La visita en el tiempo by Venezuelan writer Arturo Uslar Pietri depicts Don Juan searching for his own identity, his journey from an orphaned childhood to his transformation into the (illegitimate) son of Emperor Charles V and the hero of Lepanto. The novel won the 1991 Rómulo Gallegos Prize novel prize.

Notes

References

Bibliography
Fernand Braudel, The Mediterranean and the Mediterranean World in the Age of Philip II. 2 vols. New York, Harper, 1972, translated from La Méditerranée et le monde méditerranéen à l'époque de Philippe II, 2nd éd., Paris: 1966
Capponi, Niccolò, Victory of the West: The Great Christian-Muslim Clash at the Battle of Lepanto (2006) 
Coloma, Luis, The Story of Don John of Austria, trans. Lady Moreton, New York: 1912. John Lane Company.
Dennis, Amarie. Don Juan of Austria. Madrid, privately printed, 1966. A sensitive study of Don John, by an American long resident in Spain, it rests mainly on contemporary sources and has a lively treatment of Lepanto.
Essen, Léon van der. Alexandre Farnèse, Prince de Parme, Gouverneur Général des Pays-Bas (1578–92), 5 vols., Brussels, 1933–35
Guilmartin, J.F. Gunpowder and Galleys (revised edition, 2003)
Petrie, Sir Charles. Don John of Austria. London: 1967.
Stirling-Maxwell, William. Don John of Austria. 2 vols. London: 1883. 
Törne, P. O. de, Don Juan d'Autriche et les projets de conquête de l'Angleterre (1928)

External links

Chronicle of the battle of Lepanto  by Rev. Luis Coloma, SJ

Illegitimate children of Spanish monarchs
Illegitimate children of Holy Roman Emperors
16th-century German people
Military personnel from Regensburg
1547 births
1578 deaths
Deaths from typhus
Burials in the Pantheon of Infantes at El Escorial
Spanish generals
Spanish admirals
Spanish Roman Catholics
Governors of the Habsburg Netherlands
Spanish viceroys
Knights of the Golden Fleece
People of the Ottoman–Venetian Wars
Battle of Lepanto
Sons of emperors
Children of Charles V, Holy Roman Emperor
Sons of kings